during the year 2018 he had mustache 

Paolo Federico Nocito (Milan, Italy, 8 September 1974), better known as Paolo Noise is an Italian radio host, known for the radio programs Lo Zoo di 105 on Radio 105 Network and Asganaway on Radio Deejay.

Filmography

Movies
 Italiano medio, (2015)
 On Air: Storia di un successo (2016)

TV Series
 Via Massena, (2011-2012)

References

Italian radio presenters
Living people
1974 births
People from Brianza
People of Apulian descent